Jack Roth (1927–2004), also known as "Rodney Jack Roth", was an American painter who developed a style as an Abstract Expressionist, and as a Color Field painter.

He was born in Brockway, Pennsylvania. After studying with Mark Rothko, Clyfford Still and Richard Diebenkorn at the California School of Fine Arts (now the San Francisco Art Institute), he received a Master of Fine Arts from the University of Iowa in 1952, and a doctoral degree in mathematics from Duke University in 1962.  He taught math at Ramapo College in New Jersey, and also taught for brief periods at the University of South Florida and the University of Kentucky.  His work includes several large abstract paintings created by staining raw, unprimed canvas with thinned paint, allowing the colors to soak directly into the weave of the canvas.  He was represented by and exhibited at the Knoedler & Co. Gallery in New York City from 1979 to 1986 and was named New Talent Graphic artist of the year in 1963 by Art in America on the recommendation of MoMA curators Dorothy Miller and William S. Lieberman.  In 1979 he was awarded a Guggenheim fellowship and in 1982 he received a New Jersey Council on the Arts Award.

He exhibited paintings in the Solomon R. Guggenheim Museum "Younger American Painters" (May 12 to July 25, 1954) – alongside Sonia Gechtoff, William Baziotes, Morris Louis, Richard Diebenkorn, Adolph Gottlieb, Philip Guston, Franz Kline, Willem de Kooning, Robert Motherwell, Jackson Pollock and others. This was one of the first major exhibitions of Abstract Expressionism at an American art museum, and it traveled to the Portland Museum of Art, the San Francisco Museum of Modern Art, the Henry Art Gallery at the University of Washington, University of Arkansas, Fayetteville, Los Angeles County Museum of Art and the New Orleans Museum of Art.  He also exhibited at MoMA in 1963 and MoMA purchased several works by Roth for its permanent collections.

Selected collections

 Art Museum of South Texas, Corpus Christi
 Duke University Art Museum
 Museum of Modern Art, New York
 National Gallery of Art, Washington, D.C.
 North Carolina Museum of Art
 University of Kentucky Art Museum
 Boise Art Museum

Exhibitions

Group exhibitions

 Exhibition Momentum Midcontinental, Chicago, Illinois (1952)
 5th Annual Iowa Artists Exhibition, Des Moines Art Center, Iowa (1953)
 Younger American Painters, Solomon R. Guggenheim Museum, New York (1954) (traveled to Portland Art Museum; San Francisco Museum of Fine Arts; Los Angeles County Museum; Isaac Delgado Museum, New Orleans, Henry Art Gallery at the University of Washington, University of Arkansas, Fayetteville)
 15th Southeastern Annual, Atlanta, Georgia (1958)
 1st Hunter Gallery Annual, Chattanooga, Tennessee (1958)
 Knoxville Art Center National Exhibition, Knoxville, Tennessee (1958)
 South Coast Art Show, Sarasota, Florida (1958) (traveled to High Museum, Atlanta; North Carolina Museum of Fine Arts, Raleigh; Mint Museum, Charlotte; Birmingham Museum, Alabama)
 New Acquisitions, Museum of Modern Art, New York (1963)
 Graphics 63, University of Kentucky, Lexington, Kentucky (1963) (circulated by the Smithsonian Institution)
 Group Show, Knoedler & Co., New York (1980)
 Summer Group Show, Knoedler & Co., New York (June 21 – September 23, 1982)
 Fall Show, Rosenberg Fine Arts, Ltd., Toronto, Canada (September 11 – October 16, 1982)
 Being and Becoming: First and Second Generation Abstract Expressionist Compositions, Peyton Wright, Santa Fe, New Mexico (2015)
 Mid-Century Abstraction: The American Vanguard, Sager | Braudis Gallery, Columbia, Missouri (2018)

One-man exhibitions
 1949-50 Jack Roth, Contemporary Gallery, Sausalito, California
 1963 Jack Roth, Grand Central Moderns, New York
 1963 Jack Roth, Cinema I and II, New York
 1965 Jack Roth, Kornman Gallery, Tampa, Florida
 1967 Jack Roth, University of Florida, Jacksonville, Florida
 1978 Jack Roth, Ramapo College Art Gallery, Mahwah, New Jersey
 1980 Jack Roth: Recent Paintings, Knoedler & Co., New York
 1980 Jack Roth: Ramapo Paintings, Clocktower, New York
 1980 Gallery 99 Presents the Paintings of Jack Roth, Gallery 99, Bay Harbor Island, Florida
 1981 Jack Roth, Knoedler & Co., New York
 1982 Jack Roth: Drawings, Ramapo College Art Gallery, Mahwah, New Jersey
 1982 Jack Roth, Rosenberg Fine Arts, Ltd., Toronto, Canada
 1982 Jack Roth: Recent Paintings. Montclair Art Museum, Montclair, New Jersey
 1982-83 Jack Roth: Drawings and Watercolors. Ramapo College Art Gallery, Mahwah, New Jersey (traveled to Hiram College, Hiram, Ohio; Sweet Briar College, Sweet Briar, Virginia; Junior College of Albany, Albany, New York; Montclair State University, Montclair, New Jersey; New Jersey State Museum, Trenton, New Jersey)
 1983 Jack Roth, Millhouse-Bundy Museum, Vermont
 1983 Jack Roth, Ochi Gallery, Boise, Idaho
 1983 Jack Roth Paintings, Knoedler & Co., New York
 1983 Jack Roth, Acrylics on Paper, New Jersey State Museum, Trenton
 1985 Jack Roth Paintings, Princeton Gallery of Art, New Jersey
 1985 Jack Roth, Wyckoff Gallery, New Jersey
 1986 Jack Roth, Ramapo College Art Gallery, Mahwah, New Jersey
 1997 Colonnades Gallery, Montclair, New Jersey
 2011 When I grow up, I want to be just like Jasper Johns, Jack Roth Drawings
from the 1960s, McCormick Gallery, Chicago, Illinois

See also
Another Jack Roth was a drummer with Jimmy Durante and appeared as a guest on The Jimmy Durante Show.

And yet another Jack Roth is an English actor, the son of Tim Roth.

References

External links
 Review of Roth exhibit in New Jersey
 Vincent Vallarino Fine Art Ltd
 Featured Artists - Jack Roth

1927 births
2004 deaths
Artists from Pennsylvania
San Francisco Art Institute alumni
University of Iowa alumni
Duke University alumni
Ramapo College faculty
University of South Florida faculty
University of Kentucky faculty